Tim Donnelly (born 12 June 1980) is an Australian rugby union flyhalf.

He had previously played for the NSW Waratahs in Australia, Taranaki in New Zealand, Brive in France and Connacht in Ireland.

References 
 http://www.connachtrugby.ie/content/view/81405/2/

Living people
1980 births
Australian rugby union players
New South Wales Waratahs players
CA Brive players
Connacht Rugby players
Expatriate rugby union players in Ireland
Australian expatriate rugby union players
Australian expatriate sportspeople in Ireland
Rugby union players from Sydney
Rugby union fly-halves